William Leon "Dick" Price (September 10, 1933 – February 23, 2009) was an American football and track and field coach and college athletics administrator. He served as the head football coach at Norfolk State University from 1974 to 1983, compiling a record of 62–41–4 and leading his Norfolk State Spartans football teams to three consecutive Central Intercollegiate Athletic Association (CIAA) in his first three seasons, 1974 to 1976. Price was also the head track and field coach at Norfolk State from 1964 to 1974. His track teams won consecutive NCAA Division II Men's Outdoor Track and Field Championships in 1973 and 1974. William "Dick" Price Stadium, Norfolk State's home football venue, is named for Price.

A native of Norfolk, Virginia, Price graduated from Hampton University in 1957. He died on February 23, 2009, in Norfolk, after suffering from cancer.

Head coaching record

Football

References

1935 births
2009 deaths
Norfolk State Spartans athletic directors
Norfolk State Spartans football coaches
Norfolk State Spartans track and field coaches
Hampton University alumni
Sportspeople from Norfolk, Virginia
Coaches of American football from Virginia
African-American coaches of American football
African-American college athletic directors in the United States
Deaths from cancer in Virginia
20th-century African-American sportspeople
21st-century African-American sportspeople